László Nagy (born 21 October 1949) is a retired Hungarian football player who played for Újpesti Dózsa. Nagy is most famous for his participation in the gold medal-winning Hungarian team on the 1968 Summer Olympics, and for playing at the 1978 FIFA World Cup. He played 25 games and scored 7 goals for the Hungarian national team. He also played a season for FC Locarno.

After finishing his career, Nagy became a coach, managing Újpest FC from 1996 to 1997.

References

Sources
 MTI Ki Kicsoda 2006, Magyar Távirati Iroda, Budapest, 2005, p. 1233.
 Ki kicsoda a magyar sportéletben?, II. kötet (I–R). Szekszárd, Babits Kiadó, 1995, p. 358., 
 Rejtő László–Lukács László–Szepesi György: Felejthetetlen 90 percek (Sportkiadó, 1977) 
 Stats at MOB (p. 10.)

1949 births
Living people
1978 FIFA World Cup players
Hungarian footballers
Hungarian expatriate footballers
Hungary international footballers
Hungarian football managers
Olympic footballers of Hungary
Olympic gold medalists for Hungary
Footballers at the 1968 Summer Olympics
Association football forwards
Újpest FC players
Újpest FC managers
FC Locarno players
Expatriate footballers in Switzerland
Hungarian expatriate sportspeople in Switzerland
Olympic medalists in football
Medalists at the 1968 Summer Olympics
Sportspeople from Somogy County
BFC Siófok managers
Kecskeméti TE managers
Nemzeti Bajnokság I managers